Kerr may refer to:

People
Kerr (surname)
Kerr (given name)

Places
United States
Kerr Township, Champaign County, Illinois
Kerr, Montana, A US census-designated place 
Kerr, Ohio, an unincorporated community
Kerr County, Texas

Other uses
KERR, A US radio station
Kerr, a brand of food Mason jars and lids
Clan Kerr, a Scottish clan
Kerr's, a Canadian candy company

See also

Ker (disambiguation)